Dominic Daniel Udoh (born 30 August 1996) is a Nigerian professional footballer who plays as a forward for League One side Shrewsbury Town.

Playing career

Early career
Udoh was born in Lagos, Nigeria, then came to England with his family at the age of nine, and as a teenager joined the Luton Town development squad. He later moved on to the Stevenage Academy on a two-year scholarship. He was called up to the Nigeria under-17 squad, however Stevenage were concerned that he spent too much time on international duty and released him.

He signed on non-contract terms alongside former teammate Harold Joseph with Kidderminster Harriers. Kidderminster loaned him out to Worcester City, Wingate & Finchley, North Greenford United and Grays Athletic, but he became frustrated by a lack of match time, and ended the season at Hoddesdon Town. He was invited to a trial at Ilkeston by manager Gavin Strachan, and impressed in pre-season enough to earn a one-year contract in 2015. He remained a first team regular after Andy Watson replaced Strachan as manager in October, forming a successful partnership with Lee Ndlovu.

Crewe Alexandra
He was signed for an undisclosed fee by League One side Crewe Alexandra on 21 March 2016 after being spotted by head of recruitment Neil Baker. He made his first team debut seven days later, in a 1–0 defeat to Bradford City at Gresty Road, coming on as a 70th-minute substitute for Lauri Dalla Valle, and started the next game, at Port Vale, on 9 April 2016. He scored his first senior goal on his 20th birthday in a 3–0 win at Accrington Stanley in a Football League Trophy tie on 30 August 2016.

In early 2017, Udoh spent a loan period at Solihull Moors. On 1 September 2017, Udoh signed for Northern Premier League team Halesowen Town on a two-month loan deal (along with team mate Oliver Finney). The loan was extended by a further month in early November. He subsequently went on loan to Chester and to Leamington. Having played no first-team games for Crewe in the previous season, on 9 May 2018, Crewe manager David Artell announced Udoh would not be offered a new contract at the club.

AFC Telford United
In June 2018, Udoh signed for AFC Telford United of the National League North. He was a prolific goal scorer during his season with Telford, scoring 26 times.

Shrewsbury Town
On 31 May 2019, it was announced that Udoh had signed for local rivals Shrewsbury Town on a 2-year deal for an undisclosed fee. He made his league debut for the club on 20 August, coming on as a 79th-minute substitute and scoring an 89th-minute winner in a 2–3 away win at Accrington Stanley.

He scored the opening goal against Liverpool FC at Anfield in a 2021-22 FA Cup 3rd round game on 9 January 2022. However, Shrewsbury Town went onto lose the game 4-1.

Career statistics

References

External links

1996 births
Living people
Sportspeople from Lagos
Nigerian footballers
Association football forwards
Luton Town F.C. players
Stevenage F.C. players
Kidderminster Harriers F.C. players
Worcester City F.C. players
North Greenford United F.C. players
Wingate & Finchley F.C. players
Grays Athletic F.C. players
Hoddesdon Town F.C. players
Ilkeston F.C. players
Crewe Alexandra F.C. players
Solihull Moors F.C. players
Halesowen Town F.C. players
Chester F.C. players
Leamington F.C. players
AFC Telford United players
Shrewsbury Town F.C. players
National League (English football) players
Isthmian League players
Northern Premier League players
English Football League players